The 2009 Patriot League men's basketball tournament, a part of the 2008-09 NCAA Division I men's basketball season, took place March 4, 2009, as a single-elimination tournament, with games being played at the higher seeds' home courts. The American University Eagles won the league's regular season, and received the number one seed in the tournament. The higher seed in each match-up was the host team for each game. The Eagles became the seventh team to repeat as Patriot League champions when they beat the second seeded Holy Cross Crusaders 73–57 in the championship game, which was broadcast live on ESPN2.

Final conference standings

Bracket
The Patriot League announced the bracket and seed on February 28, 2009.

* represents an overtime period

References

Tournament
Patriot League men's basketball tournament
Patriot League men's basketball tournament